Barnaby Conrad III (born 1952) is an American author, artist, and editor.

Early years
Conrad was born in San Francisco in 1952, the son of author Barnaby Conrad, Jr and architect Dale (Cowgill) Crichton. His father was an amateur bullfighter, and published the bestselling book Matador the same year that Conrad III was born. It is said that Conrad III barely escaped being named after his father's friend Juan Belmonte.

Education
Conrad graduated from the Taft School in Watertown, Connecticut, then studied painting and illustration at Yale University, under Lester Johnson and Maurice Sendak.

Early career
After graduating Yale with a B.A. in Fine Arts in 1975, Conrad worked as a journalist and magazine editor. His first published story was about his experiences running with the bulls in Pamplona, which he sold to the San Francisco Examiner for $100. Much of his work was for art magazines: he was one of the founding editors of Art World in the 1970s, and a senior editor of Horizon from 1979-80. In 1982, Conrad moved to Paris and became an adventure travel writer. He wrote articles about riding trains across India, skiing in the Alps, and hot air ballooning over Germany, for magazines such as Condé Nast Traveler, and Forbes Life, for which he served as editor-at-large.

Book author
Conrad's first book credit was as an illustrator of his father's children's book, Zorro - A Fox in the City, in 1971. He co-authored a book of interviews with photographers in 1977, then didn't write any more books until Absinthe: History In a Bottle, in 1988, his first book as a solo author. As of 2011, Conrad has authored over 11 non-fiction books, and hundreds of magazine articles for over 30 publications. The Martini: An Illustrated History of an American Classic (1995) has sold over 160,000 hardcover copies. He has taught other aspiring authors at the Santa Barbara Writers Conference, which was founded by his father.

Publishing
In 2009, Conrad joined independent book publisher Council Oak Books, where he founded a new imprint, "Kanbar & Conrad Books", with inventor-philanthropist Maurice Kanbar. The inaugural book of the imprint was The Second Life of John Wilkes Booth, by Conrad's father, Barnaby Conrad.

Painting

Though Conrad painted throughout his career, he didn't return to showing his works professionally until later in life. He exhibited in 20 group shows in San Francisco, and held his first solo show in New York City, in 2009, at his wife's gallery, M. Sutherland Fine Arts. It focused on aquatic animals from his hobby, fly fishing.

Personal life

Conrad married art gallery owner Martha Sutherland on May 24, 2003.

Bibliography
 Zorro - A Fox in the City (illustrator). Written by Barnaby Conrad. 1971, Doubleday; .
 Interviews with Master Photographers: Minor White, Imogen Cunningham, Cornell Capa, Elliot Erwit, Yousef Karsh, Arnold Newman, Lord Snowden, Brett Weston. With James Danziger. 1977, Paddington Press; .
 Absinthe: History In a Bottle. 1988, Chronicle Books; .
 Gottfried Helnwein: Paintings, Drawings, Photographs: 1992, Modernism, Inc.
 The Martini: An Illustrated History of an American Classic. 1995, Chronicle Books; .
 The Cigar: An Illustrated History of Fine Smoking. 1996, Chronicle Books; .
 Les Chiens de Paris. 1996, Chronicle Books; .
 Les Chats de Paris. 1996, Chronicle Books; .
 The Blonde: A Celebration of the Golden Era from Harlowe to Monroe. 1999, Chronicle Books; .
 John Register: Persistent Observer.  1999, Woodford Press; .
 Pan Am: An Aviation Legend. 1999, Woodford Press; .
 Mark Stock: Paintings. 2000, Duane Press; .
 Ghost Hunting in Montana: A Search for Roots in the Old West. 2003, The Lyons Press; .
 Richard Diebenkorn: Figurative Works on Paper (with John McEnroe and Jane Livingston. 2003, Chronicle Books; .
 Valentin Popov (with Robert Flynn Johnson). 2008, Modernism, Inc.; 
 David Bates: the Tropics. 2008, John Berggruen Gallery.
 The Bachelor's Progress. 2012, Council Oak Distribution;. .

References

1952 births
American book editors
20th-century American painters
American male painters
21st-century American painters
American male writers
Living people
Writers from the San Francisco Bay Area
Bull runners
20th-century American male artists